The 2013 WAFF U-16 Championship is the fourth edition of the WAFF Youth Competition. The previous edition was an Under-15 age group competition held in Jordan in 2009.

Participating nations
4 West Asian Federation teams entered the competition.

Tournament information
All games were hosted at the Faisal Al-Husseini International Stadium. Initially, players and staff had been denied entry to the West Bank by Israeli authorities.  Israel issued entry visas following an intervention from Jordanian prince and FIFA Vice-President Prince Ali Bin Al-Hussein. The competition has been temporarily postponed due to the issue.

Results

Champion

Statistics

Goalscorers

References

External links 
 

U16 2013
2013
2013–14 in Palestinian football
2013 in Asian football